Les Yeux sans visage may refer to:
Les Yeux sans visage, a 1960 French film also known as Eyes Without a Face
"Les Yeux Sans Visage", a 1996 Combustible Edison song
"Eyes Without a Face (song)", a 1983 Billy Idol song